The 1952–53 Serie C was the fifteenth edition of Serie C, the third highest league in the Italian football league system.

The tournament was organized in a single table for the first time.

Events
The league was organized into a single division of 18 teams.
5 had been relegated from Serie B after 1951–52 season;
11 had confirmed their places in the third division for the performances in 1951–52 Serie C;
2 obtained the place after a 4 teams qualification round.

No team had been promoted from lower divisions in 1951–52 season.

Each team played a total of 34 matches (17 at home, 17 away). The 2–1–0 point system was used for the classification.

At the end of the 34th round, teams at the first two positions of the classification were promoted in Serie B for the 1953–54 season. On the contrary, teams which finished their league at the last four places were relegated in IV Serie.

Teams

Final classification

Results

Serie C seasons
3
Italy